The International Christian Union of Business Executives or UNIAPAC is an ecumenical organization for Christian businesspeople.

History

The predecessors of the organization were national federations of Catholic employers in The Netherlands in 1915, Belgium in 1921 and France in 1926. In 1931, a group of Catholic employers created an International Comité d'Initiative at the 40th anniversary of the encyclical Rerum novarum in Rome. In addition they took the initiative to organize regularly Internationales des Associations Patronales Catholiques. UNIAPAC was founded in Rome in 1931 as the International Conferences of Catholic Employers by the organizations of Catholic entrepreneurs from France, Belgium and The Netherlands and also people from Italy, Germany and Czechoslovakia.

In 1946, under  General Secretary A.H.M. Albregst, UNIAPAC was established as the Union Internationale des Associations Patronales Catholiques. In 1948 UNIAPAC expanded to Latin America, starting in Chile. In 1958, a permanent international secretariat was created in Brussels with the support of Léon Bekaert (Belgium) and Peter H. Werhahn (Germany).

Presidents
 1956-1959: Giuseppe Mosca (Italy)
 1960-1964:  (Germany)
 1965-1968: Léon de Rosen (France)
 1969-1972: Reinier A.H.M. Dobbelmann (The Netherlands) 
 1973-1976: Romuald Burkard (Switzerland) 
 1977-1981: Carlos E. Dietl (Argentina) 
 1981-1985: Léon Antoine Bekaert (Belgium) 
 1986-1987: Philippe de Weck (Switzerland) 
 1988-1990: Ernst van den Biggelaar (The Netherlands) 
 1990-1993: Michel Albert (France) 
 1994-1996: Guy de Wouters (Belgium) 
 1997-2000: Domingo Sugranyes Bickel (Spain) 
 2000-2003: H. Onno Ruding (The Netherlands) 
 2003-2006: Etienne Wibaux (France) 
 2006-: José Ignacio Mariscal (Mexico)

Sources
 http://www.lesedc.org/Uniapac.html 
 http://www.christiansinpolitics.org/May-2005-The-UNIAPAC_a163.html
 John D. Donovan, The Catholic Movement of Employers and Managers: A Study of UNIAPAC, Journal for the Scientific Study of Religion, Vol. 3, No. 2 (Spring, 1964), pp. 276–277

External links
 UNIAPAC
 UNIAPAC in ODIS - Online Database for Intermediary Structures 
 UNIAPAC Belgium in ODIS - Online Database for Intermediary Structures

Religious organisations based in Belgium
International trade associations
Christian parachurch organizations